Deryn Brace (born 15 March 1975) is a Welsh footballer.

Career
Born in Haverfordwest, Brace began his career as a trainee with Norwich City, turning professional in July 1993. He left in April 1994 to join Wrexham having failed to make the first team at Carrow Road. He spent six years with Wrexham, playing in over 100 league games, and also playing in the European Cup Winners Cup and in an FA Cup quarter final. He won ten Under 21 caps for Wales and only missed a full cap through illness, having contracted pneumonia.

He was released by Wrexham in May 2000 and early in the following season joined Llanelli. Later that season he moved to Carmarthen Town and during the 2001–02 season left to join Haverfordwest County. In June 2002 he was appointed player-manager of Haverfordwest, at the age of just 27 years, guiding them to a UEFA Cup spot in his second season in charge. He also works full-time as postman and stepped down from his manager's post due to his work commitments in October 2006. He initially remained as player, but was released later that month by new manager Derek Brazil and rejoined Carmarthen Town.

He was appointed as player-manager of Carmarthen in May 2007, where he remained for three years before stepping down in June 2010.

Managerial statistics

References

External links

Welsh Premier League profile
Wales stats at 11v11

1975 births
Living people
Welsh footballers
Wales youth international footballers
Wales under-21 international footballers
Norwich City F.C. players
Wrexham A.F.C. players
Llanelli Town A.F.C. players
Carmarthen Town A.F.C. players
English Football League players
Cymru Premier players
Welsh football managers
Haverfordwest County A.F.C. managers
Carmarthen Town A.F.C. managers
Cymru Premier managers
Association football defenders
Haverfordwest County A.F.C. players